List of the butterfly species of Trinidad and Tobago, an island nation located in the Caribbean region off the northeast coast of South America.

The combined efforts of generations of resident and visiting naturalists have helped to make the butterfly fauna of Tobago well known. Some 129 species have been recorded on the island of Tobago that has a land area of only 300 km2 (116 mi2) and is approximately 42 km long and 10 km wide.

This list follows Malcolm Barcant (1970) who is the main source of information on the butterflies of Tobago. His book is no longer in print, but used copies are available at booksellers. Barcant gives each species an English common name, but many of these were never taken up. Barcant's English name and the more widely accepted English name are given in the list below. Since 1970 many of the Latin names used by Barcant have also changed. The 2004 catalog of Lamas was used to update the taxonomy.

There is little data on the seasonal distribution or abundance of the listed butterflies. In general, butterflies are more abundant in the wet season. However, in the dry season, when most people visit, and especially if the dry season is a wet one, there are many whites/yellows on the wing. These are hard to identify without capture. Other butterflies commonly seen in the dry season in the south west of the island are the monarch butterfly (Danaus plexippus), the white peacock (Anartia jatrophe), the brown peacock (Anartia amathea), the West Indian buckeye (Junonia evarete) and the red rim (Biblis hyperia). Away from the flat south west towards Arnos Vale, there are many other butterflies to be found, including skippers and blues and the blue tinted handkerchief (Dynamine theseus). In the rain forest, on the main ridge, butterflies are quite scarce at this time of year.

Papilionidae, swallowtails 

 Battus polydamas, black page or gold rim
 Papilio androgeus, Androgeus, queen page or queen swallowtail
 Parides neophilus parianus, spear-winged cattleheart

Pieridae, whites and yellows 

 Aphrissa statira, yellow migrant
 Phoebis sennae sennae, cloudless sulphur
 Phoebis argante, apricot
 Phoebis philea, orange-barred sulphur
 Anteos maerula, yellow angled sulphur or gonatryx
 Pyrisitia proterpia, tailed orange or little jaune (called Eureme proerpia by Barcant)
 Eurema albula, ghost yellow or small white
 Eurema venusta, little yellow
 Eurema leuce, small yellow
 Eurema elathea, small banded yellow
 Eurema arbela, jagged-edged yellow (called Eureme gratiosa by Barcant)
 Appias drusilla, pure white
 Ascia monuste, cabbage white

Nymphalidae, four-footed butterflies 
Their taxonomy is currently being revised.

Satyrinae, browns 

 Taygetis echo, echo satyr
 Taygetis laches
 Euptychia hesione
 Euptychia myncea
 Euptychia terrestris
 Hermeuptychia hermes
 Euptychia junia
 Euptychia libye
 Cissia penelope, Penelope's satyr
 Cissia palladia, Butler's satyr

Danainae 
 Danaus plexippus, monarch butterfly

Ithomiinae 
 Pteronymia alissa, small rare blue transparent (called P. amandes by Barcant)
 Ithomia pellucida, blue transparent
 Hymenitis andromica, rare blue transparent

Heliconiinae, longwing butterflies 

 Heliconius melpomene tessa, postman
 Heliconius erato tobagoensis, small postman or red postman
 Heliconius ethilla, ethilia longwing
 Eueides aliphera, small flambeau (called Heliconius aliphera by Barcant)
 Eueides isabella, Isabella's heliconian
 Dryas iulia, flambeau or Julia butterfly (called Calaenis iulia by Barcant)
 Agraulis vanillae, silver spotted flambeau or Gulf fritillary

Limenitidinae, admirals 
 Adelpha iphiclus, Iphiclus sister

Nymphalinae 

 Hypanartia lethe, orange admiral
 Hypolimnas misippus, Danaid eggfly
 Anartia jatrophae jatrophae, white peacock
 Anartia amathea, scarlet peacock
 Junonia evarete evarete, West Indian buckeye

Biblidinae 

 Dynamine theseus, blue tinted handkerchief
 Dynamine mylitta, large dynamine
 Hamadryas februa, grey cracker
 Mestra hypermestra, grey handkerchief
 Biblis hyperia, red rim
 Vanessa cardui, painted lady
 Marpesia petreus, ruddy daggerwing or tailed flambeau
 Historis odius, grape shoemaker
 Diaethria clymena, Cramer's eighty-eight

Charaxinae 
 Archaeoprepona demophoon, silver king shoemaker (called Prepona antimache by Barcant)
 Prepona laertes, purple king shoemaker

Morphinae

Morphini, morphos 
 Morpho peleides, morpho butterfly (called emperor butterfly by Barcant)

Brassolini, owl butterflies 
 Caligo eurilochus, owl butterfly or forest blue mort
 Caligo teucer, owl butterfly or cocoa blue mort
 Opsiphanes cassiae

Riodinidae, metalmarks 
 Perophthalma tullius, grey nymph
 Anteros formosus, gold drop
 Lymnas iarbas, underleaf (maybe the same species as Melanis iarbas)
 Lymnas xarifa, orange-tipped underleaf
 Mesene phareus, red devil
 Lasaia agesilas, shining blue lasaia or green lasaia
 Emesis caeneus, black-speckled emesis
 Emesis progne, small brown emesis
 Theope eudocia, orange theope
 Theope virgilius, cream theope or blue-based theope
 Synargis calyce, blue transparent
 Hymenitis andromica, variable lemmark or brown and cream nymula

Lycaenidae, blues 

 Hemiargus hanno, common blue
 Leptotes cassius, Cassius blue, tropical striped blue or meadow blue
 Strymon faunalia (called Leptotes faunalia by Barcant)
 Strymon bubastus (called Leptotes bubastus by Barcant)
 Tmolus basalides,
 Ministrymon echion, four-spotted hairstreak or red-spotted hairstreak (called Leptotes bubastus  by Barcant)
 Calycopis beon (maybe the same species as C. isobeon, the dusty blue hairstreak)
 Calycopis hesperitis
 Calycopis cyphara
 Calycopis sangala
 Calycopis spurina, brick-spotted blue
 Calicopis calus, violet-tinted hairstreak
 Chalybs herodotus, large green hairstreak
 Chalybs simaethis, silver-banded hairstreak
 Rekoa palegon, gold-bordered hairstreak or slated hairstreak
 Rekoa zebina, Zebina hairstreak or double-spotted slate wing (called Thecla zebiina  by Barcant)
 Pseudolycaena marsyas, Cambridge blue or giant hairstreak

Hesperiidae, skippers 

 Eudamus proteus, long-tailed skipper
 Eudamus catillus
 Eudamus dorantes
 Eudamus simplicius
 Eudamus undalatus
 Eudamus eurycles
 Eudamus aminias
 Eudamus octomaculata
 Polites vibex praeceps, whirlabout
 Mysoria venezuelae
 Phanus marshalli
 Celaenorrhinus eligius
 Pellicia bessus
 Pellicia bromias
 Hesperia syrichtus
 Hylephila phyleus, fiery skipper
 Mucia thyia
 Calpodes ethlius
 Prenes nyctelius
 Prenes ocola
 Prenes sylvicola
 Vacerra litana
 Niconiades xanthaphes
 Niconiades gesta
 Mnasitheus simplicissimus
 Megistias telata
 Megistias epiberus
 Megistias cortica
 Carystus fantasos
 Carystus phorcus
 Cymaenes silius pericles
 Epius veleda
 Callimormus corades
 Callimormus juventa
 Thracides antonius
 Perichares corydon
 Ouleus fridericus, Fridericus spreadwing
 Systacea erosa
 Lerodea tripunctata
 Lerodea phocilides
 Rhinthon bistrigula
 Rhinthon cubana orca, orca skipper
 Talides sinon
 Atrytone pericia
 Lerema parum punctata
 Urbanus procne, brown longtail

Hedylidae 
The moth butterflies were not recorded.

References 

 Barcant, M. (1970). Butterflies of Trinidad and Tobago. Collins, London.
 Lamas, G. (Ed.). (2004). Checklist: Part 4A. Hesperioidea-Papilionoidea. Gainesville, Florida: Association for Tropical Lepidoptera. 

 Butterflies
Butterflies
Trinidad
Trinidad
Trinidad and Tobago
Trinidad and Tobago